Major General Ahmed Ali Al-Ashwal (born September 26, 1949) is a retired Yemeni Army General.  He previously served as the General Chief of Staff for Yemeni Armed Forces from April 2006 to December 2014. Prior to that he served as Commanding General of the Yemeni Military Academy from 1994 to 2006, Commanding General of the Yemeni Air Force and Air Defense Academy from 1980 to 1994, Commander of the 2nd Brigade Alasifah "The Storm" from 1974 to 1977, and Staff Brigadier of the 2nd Brigade Alasifah "The Storm" from 1972 to 1974.

References

Yemeni generals
1949 births
Living people
Chiefs of the General Staff (Yemen)